The April 1876 Connecticut gubernatorial election was held on April 3, 1876. Incumbent governor and Democratic nominee Charles R. Ingersoll defeated Republican nominee H. Robinson with 51.85% of the vote.

This was the last gubernatorial election held in April, and the only one to elect the governor of Connecticut to a term just short of eight months, from May 7, 1876, to January 3, 1877.

General election

Candidates
Major party candidates
Charles R. Ingersoll, Democratic
H. Robinson, Republican

Other candidates
Charles Atwater, Greenback
Henry D. Smith, Prohibition

Results

References

1876
Connecticut
Gubernatorial